David Bauzá Francés (born 29 May 1976) is a Spanish former footballer who played as a defensive midfielder.

Club career
Bauzá was born in Alicante, Valencian Community. He appeared in 354 Segunda División matches and scored 16 goals over 12 seasons, representing five clubs in that tier, mainly Sporting de Gijón and Albacete Balompié (three years apiece).

Late into his career, during his spell with SD Huesca, Bauzá suffered two nearly-consecutive anterior cruciate ligament injuries – right and left knees – which sidelined him for a period of almost two years. He retired at the end of the 2011–12 campaign whilst at the service of that team, aged 36.

References

External links

1976 births
Living people
Footballers from Alicante
Spanish footballers
Association football midfielders
Segunda División players
Segunda División B players
FC Barcelona C players
Yeclano CF players
UDA Gramenet footballers
CF Gandía players
CD Badajoz players
Sporting de Gijón players
Albacete Balompié players
Gimnàstic de Tarragona footballers
SD Huesca footballers